Clare Scott (born 23 September 2001) is an Australian cricketer who plays as a right-arm medium bowler for Tasmania in the Women's National Cricket League (WNCL).

Domestic career
Scott made her debut for Tasmania on 2 March 2022, against Victoria in the 2021–22 WNCL. She took 2/39 in the match, dismissing both openers as her side won by 47 runs. She went on to play three more matches for the side that season, taking one further wicket. She played two matches for the side in the 2022–23 WNCL.

References

External links

2001 births
Living people
Place of birth missing (living people)
Australian women cricketers
Tasmanian Tigers (women's cricket) cricketers